Debo Ogundoyin (born 18 February 1987) is a Nigerian politician. He is the current speaker of the Ninth Oyo State House of Assembly and member representing Ibarapa East constituency under the platform of the Peoples Democratic Party PDP.

He assumed office on 10 June 2019.

Personal life and education 
Debo Ogundoyin is from Ibarapa East constituency, Oyo State. He is a graduate of Babcock University. He was elected to the House to represent the Ibarapa East State Constituency and was elected Speaker of the House without opposition on Monday, 10 June 2019.

A second timer, he was first elected into the 8th house of Assembly in 2018 on the platform of the Peoples Democratic Party (PDP) after he won the bye-election, which was held after the death of the former Speaker, Rt. Hon. Michael Adeyemo, who died on Friday, 27 April 2018.

Family background 
Debo Ogundoyin is one of the sons of the late foremost philanthropist and industrialist, Chief Adeseun Ogundoyin. He lost his father, Adeseun Ogundoyin, in 1991 at four years old.
Chief Adeseun Ogundoyin, Alhaji Arisekola Alao, Chief Akanni Aluko dominated the social scene like the roaring lions dominated the jungle in Ibadan during their days.

References 

21st-century Nigerian politicians
Living people
1987 births